Ryan Osborn is an American football coach who is currently the defensive coordinator for the Charlotte 49ers.

Coaching career
In 2016, Osborn began his coaching career as a graduate assistant at Mississippi State for one year until he left for Florida as again a graduate assistant until 2019. He got his first full coaching job when he was hired by UT Martin to be their defensive lineman coach. The following year, he joined Michigan as a defensive analyst. His coaching impact was shown almost immediately as he helped guide Aidan Hutchinson to first-team All-American honors and become a Heisman Trophy finalist while also breaking many records at Michgian. His leadership and skills helped him land a job with the Baltimore Ravens as a defensive assistant where he was joined by former Wolverine David Ojabo, who was recently drafted in the 2022 NFL draft by the Ravens 

Following the 2022 NFL season, Osborn became the new defensive coordinator for the Charlotte 49ers under new head coach Biff Poggi.

References

External links
 
 Charlotte 49ers profile
 Baltimore Ravens profile

Living people
Mississippi State Bulldogs football coaches
Florida Gators football coaches
UT Martin Skyhawks football coaches
Michigan Wolverines football coaches
Charlotte 49ers football coaches
Year of birth missing (living people)